Qaqinkurani (Aymara qaqinkura wading bird; a South American ibis (Theristicus) -ni a suffix to indicate ownership, "the one with the ibis (or ibises)", also spelled Jajencurani) is a mountain north of the Apolobamba mountain range in the Andes of Peru, about  high. It is located in the Puno Region, Sandia Province, Quiaca District, southwest of Quiaca. It lies at the Chuqichampi River.

See also 
 K'ayrani
 Liqiliqini

References 

Mountains of Puno Region
Mountains of Peru